Kinsgley Lang (born 29 February 1988) is a Zimbabwean rugby union player. He plays as a flanker.

Lang started his career in Zimbabwe, moving afterwards to Australia, where he played for Sunshine Coast Stingrays, from Brisbane, until 2009/10. He moved to Bury St Edmunds RUFC for 2010/11, and after to Jersey, where he plays, since 2011/12. He played at the British and Irish Cup.

He is an international player for Zimbabwe. At present, he works for De La Salle College as a sports teacher.

References

1988 births
Living people
Zimbabwean rugby union players
Rugby union flankers